The 2020–21 Michigan State Spartans men's ice hockey season was the 80th season of play for the program and the 31st season in the Big Ten Conference. The Spartans represented Michigan State University and were coached by Danton Cole, in his 4th season.

Season
As a result of the ongoing COVID-19 pandemic the entire college ice hockey season was delayed. Because the NCAA had previously announced that all winter sports athletes would retain whatever eligibility they possessed through at least the following year, none of Michigan State's players would lose a season of play. However, the NCAA also approved a change in its transfer regulations that would allow players to transfer and play immediately rather than having to sit out a season, as the rules previously required.

In the first half of their season, Michigan State could find very little consistency but were able to hold their own in the Big Ten. Up until mid-January the team had a .500 record and had a chance to make something of their abbreviated season. Unfortunately, from the 15th onward, the team's offense collapsed MSU wasn't able to score more than two goals in a game after January 9 and went 2–13 to end their season The Spartans' defense was not a problem most games but with so few goals scored, the team sank to the bottom of the conference standings. MSU's offense was so paltry that the team averaged less than one and a half goals per game for the entire season (1.48) and were shut out in 6 of their 27 games.

Jon Mor sat out the season.

Departures

Recruiting

Roster
As of January 3, 2021.

Standings

Schedule and Results

|-
!colspan=12 style=";" | Regular Season

|-
!colspan=12 style=";" |

Scoring statistics

Goaltending statistics

Rankings

USCHO did not release a poll in week 20.

References

External links

Michigan State Spartans men's ice hockey seasons
Michigan State Spartans
Michigan State Spartans
Michigan State Spartans
Michigan State Spartans
Michigan State Spartans